The Virudhagiriswarar Temple is a Hindu temple in the town of Virudhachalam, Cuddalore district of Tamil Nadu, India. The presiding deity Virudhagiriswarar is revered in Tevaram, written by Tamil saint poets known as the nayanmars and classified as Paadal Petra Sthalam. The temple gives its name to the town of Virudhachalam. The temple is famed for the legend of Shiva forming as a mountain heeding to the prayers of Brahma.

Virudhagirswarar temple is a part of the series of temples built by Sembiya Madevi, the Chola queen along the banks of river Kaveri. It has several inscriptions dating back to the Chola period. The temple has six daily rituals at various times from 5:30 a.m. to 8 p.m., and three yearly festivals on its calendar. The annual Brahmotsavam (prime festival), Masi Magam, is attended by thousands of devotees from far and near. The temple is maintained and administered by the Hindu Religious and Endowment Board of the Government of Tamil Nadu.

Legend

As per Hindu Mythology, when Brahma thought of creating the earth, he created water. Lord Vishnu happened to cut down the evil Madhukaidavas. The cut pieces of the bodies floated on water created by Lord Brahma. On seeing that Brahma prayed to Lord Shiva to create the earth out of the hardened compound from the water and the flesh of the bodies. Lord Shiva appeared as a mountain. Lord Brahma who did not know this created many different mountains. As they did not have space to exist, he was sorrowful. The Pranava God appeared and conveyed Lord Brahma the truth through gestures. Brahma worshipped Lord Shiva who was the form of mountain. Lord Shiva created the earth combining the flesh and the water compounded in a hardened form. He called it medhini. He gave space for the mountains of Brahma. He told Brahma that he was not different from the mountain. The mountains of Brahma came into being after that mountain. Hence the mountain of Shiva was named Pazha malai (old mountain). According to him, that Pazhamalai would be hard pressed on the earth appearing as Shiva Linga above. Those who worshipped it would get all they wished for. Thus, the oldest of all mountains is invisible, but the top layer of it is said to appear in the river-bed of Cuddalore at Vayalur, about four km north of Virudhachalam.

Etymology
Vriddha means ancient – Achalam means the unshakeable, so the hills around Virudhachalam are the unshakeable hills. Virudhachalam means an ancient hill. In chaste Tamil this is mentioned as Mudhu Kundram in Thevaram hymns. During the days of Saivite Saints Appar, Gnanasambandhar and Sundarar, the place was known as Pazhamalai in Tamil and changed to the Sanskrit version Virudhachalam in the days that followed.

Architecture 
The ancient Chola temple of Virudhagiriswarar was commissioned by Sembiyan Mahadevi, among the most powerful queens of the Chola empire and an ardent worshipper of Lord Siva. The temple is surrounded by high walls and five gopurams. The mandapam is carved like a chariot. The chains of the temple car were donated by Charles Hyde, the District Collector of the then South Arcot district in 1813. The place was originally called Thirumudukundram, the place of holy mountain. Similar architecture of halls (Mandapas) simulating a chariot drawn by elephant or horses is found in Sarangapani temple at Kumbakonam, Mela Kadambur Amirthakadeswarar Temple, Sikharagiriswara Temple, Kudumiyamalai, Nageswaraswamy Temple, Kumbakonam, and Thyagaraja Temple, Tiruvarur.

Literary mention

Sage Vibasithu paid the labours with Vanni leaves. He had a dip in the Manimuthar river and undertook the renovation of this temple. He gave the workers the leaves of the Vanni tree which later changed into coins to the value due to the workers based on the quantum and quality of his work, is a story believed by generations of devotees. The Vanni tree is 1700-year-old, say researchers. The construction of the temple, by itself, has an interesting legend. Vibasithu Munivar, it is said, happened to find the earring that belonged to Lord Kubera's daughter. The jewel, dear to her, was dropped on the lap of Vibhasithu, by a bird. Kubera's daughter announced a reward of all her remaining Jewellery in return for her earring. Vibhasithu gave the earring and with the reward he constructed the temple.

It is one of the shrines of the 275 Paadal Petra Sthalams. Saint Sundarar was on a fund-raising mission to feed the devotees on the Panguni Uthiram festival in Tiruvarur. Sundarar passed through this place without singing the glory of the Lord. He was stopped by the Lord and made him sing. Then, Lord of this temple donated 12,000 gold coins to Sundararar. Beware of robbers on the way, he placed all the coins in the Manimuthar River and collected it in the tank in Tiruvarur. This is a strange precaution. Money placed in a river cannot be collected from a tank that has no link with each other. But this miracle happened. Thus, came the proverb, “losing in the river and searching in the tank”. Sundarar wanted to test the touch of the gold he took from the tank in Tiruvarur. Lord proved the quality of the gold with Lord Vinayaka as a witness who confirmed the touch. Hence, Vinayaka in the inner prakara of the temple is praised as Mattru-touch, Uraitha-confirmed, Vinayaka- Mattru Uraitha Vinayaka.

Religious importance
Number five has a significance in this temple. Murthis are five – Lords Vinayaka, Muruga, Shiva, Shakthi and Chandikeswara. Lord is praised by five names – Virudhagireeshwarar, Pazhamalai Nathar, Vruddhachaleswarar, Mudhu Kundreeswarar and Vruddhagiri. There are five Vinayakas in the temple – Aazhathu Vinayakar, Mattru Uraitha Vinayaka, Muppillayar, Dasabhuja Ganapathy and Vallabha Ganapathi. Five Rishis had the darshan of Lord – Romesa, Vibasiddhu, Kumaradeva, Nada Sharma and Anavardhini. There five towers in the temple at east, west, south, north and Kandarathithan (a Chola king) gopuram. There are five prakaras – called Thiruchutru in Tamil They are Kailaya, Vanniyadi, 63 Nayanmar Chuttru and Panchavarna Chuttru. There are five Kodimarams - flag post with five Nandhis – Indra Nandhi, Vedha Nandhi, Athma Nandhi, Maalvidai Nandhi and Dharma Nandhi. There are five inner Mandaps – Artha, Idaikazhi, Thapana, Maha and Isai Mandapams.
Outer Mandapams are 20 pillar mandapam, Deeparadhana, 100 pillar mandapam, Vipachithu and Chitra mandapam. Five-time puja is followed in the temple - Thiruvanandal, Kalasanthi, Uchi Kala, Sayaraksha and Arthajama at scheduled times from early morning till night. The temple has five cars-Raths for Lords Vinayaka, Muruga, Pazhamalai Nathar, Mother Periyanayagi and Sri Chandikeswara. The place has five names – Tirumudhu Kundram, Vruddha Kasi, Virudhachalam, Nerkuppai and Mudhugiri.

It is the faith of the devotees that salvation is surety if he/she is born in the place, or live in the place, or pray the Lord here, or even thinking of him even while elsewhere and die in this place. One of the above five criteria will free him/her from the cycle of births and deaths. When the world was destroyed by pralaya floods, it is said that this holy place - Virudhachalam stood unaffected and fully alive.
Of the 1008 Shiva shrines of the country considered in high esteem, four lead this divine list of which Virudhachalam is one.

It is one of the places giving salvation to the departed. It is even considered holier than Holy Kasi i.e. Varanasi. As believed in Kasi, here too Mother Viruthambigai places the departed souls on her lap and fan them with the pallu of her Sari while Lord Shiva chants the Namasivaya mantra in the ears of the dead ensuring his/her salvation. Hence in olden days people of Virudhachalam never bothered to undertake a pilgrimage to Varanasi when they become old and weak. As a result, this place is also come to known as Virudhakasi. It is also claimed that the benefit measure is a little bit more here than Kasi, hence the saying “Kasiyil Veesam Adhigam in Virudhakasi”. The ashes of the dead when dissolved in Manimuthar River change into a stone and stay underneath, according to Sthalapuranam. Lord Shiva as Nataraja danced in Thillai for a contest. He played here for his own joy.

During his visit to this place, the king of Karnataka suffered due to hunger. Mother Peria Nayaki, as a young woman fed him with milk and named him Kumara Deva.

Viruthambigai means Goddess of elderly age. Devotee Guru Namshivayar stayed in this place for a night on his way to Chidambaram. He was very hungry and called Mother with a verse with a word Kizhavi. Mother Periyanayagi came there as an old woman and replied that Kizhavi-old woman cannot bring food, only young woman can. The devotee sang another verse describing the youthfulness of Ambica. She appeared as a young beautiful woman and fed the devotee and thus came to be known as Balambika – young Mother.

Worship and religious practices 
The temple priests perform the puja (rituals) during festivals and on a daily basis. Like other Shiva temples of Tamil Nadu, the priests belong to the Shaiva community, a Brahmin sub-caste. The temple rituals are performed six times a day; Ushathkalam at 5:30 a.m., Kalasanthi at 8:00 a.m., Uchikalam at 10:00 a.m., Sayarakshai at 5:00 p.m., Irandamkalam at 7:00 p.m. and Ardha Jamam at 8:00 p.m. Each ritual comprises four steps: abhisheka (sacred bath), alangaram (decoration), naivethanam (food offering) and deepa aradanai (waving of lamps) for both Virudhagiriswarar and Viruthambigai Amman. The worship is held amidst music with nagaswaram (pipe instrument) and tavil (percussion instrument), religious instructions in the Vedas (sacred texts) read by priests and prostration by worshippers in front of the temple mast. Maasi Magam is an important festival. It is believed that Vibasithu Munivar sought the darshan of Lord Siva, through the Nandi. On the sixth day of the Masi Magam festival, Lord Vriddhagiriswarar, along with his Consort Goddess Viruthambigai, appeared before Vibasithu Munivar. The consecration of the temple was performed on 7 February 2022.

References

External links

Padal Petra Stalam
Shiva temples in Cuddalore district
Temples with Bharatanatyam Karanas